The 2004–05 Irish Cup was the 125th edition of Northern Ireland's premier football knock-out cup competition. It concluded on 7 May 2005 with the final.

Glentoran were the defending champions, winning their 20th Irish Cup last season after a 1–0 win over Coleraine in the 2004 final. This season the Glens reached the semi-final stage, but were defeated by Portadown, who then went on to lift the cup for the third time with a 5–1 victory over Larne in the final.

It was the highest scoring final in 36 years, since the 1969 final replay when Ards defeated Distillery 4–2. It was also the first time in 43 years that the final had been won by a four-goal margin, when Linfield defeated Portadown 4–0 in 1962. This was Larne's fifth appearance in the final without ever winning; a record in the competition that still stands. They had previously been runners-up in the 1928, 1935, 1987 and 1989 finals. Derry Celtic (1898 and 1904) and Limavady (1885 and 1886) are the only other clubs to have reached the final more than once, but never won.

Fifth round

|}

1Newry City were disqualified for fielding an ineligible player. Bangor were reinstated.

Replays

|}

Sixth round

|}

Replays

|}

Quarter-finals

|}

Replays

|}

Semi-finals

|}

Replay

|}

Final

References

2004-05
2004–05 domestic association football cups
Cup